Mimorista is a genus of moths of the family Crambidae described by William Warren in 1890.

Species
Mimorista botydalis (Guenée, 1854)
Mimorista brunneoflavalis (Hampson, 1913)
Mimorista citronalis (Hampson, 1913)
Mimorista citrostictalis (Hampson, 1913)
Mimorista costistictalis (Hampson, 1918)
Mimorista diopalis (Hampson, 1913)
Mimorista jamaicalis (Haimbach, 1915)
Mimorista leucoplacalis (Hampson, 1918)
Mimorista marginalis Warren, 1896
Mimorista matronulalis (Möschler, 1886)
Mimorista subcostalis (Hampson, 1913)
Mimorista trimaculalis (Grote, 1878)
Mimorista trisemalis (Dognin, 1910)
Mimorista tristigmalis (Hampson, 1899)
Mimorista villicalis (Möschler, 1886)

References

Spilomelinae
Crambidae genera
Taxa named by William Warren (entomologist)